Bass Lake may refer to:

Cities, towns, townships, unincorporated communities
In the United States:
 Bass Lake, California, a census-designated place in Madera County
 Bass Lake Annex, California
 Bass Lake, Indiana, a census-designated place
 Bass Lake, Michigan, an unincorporated community in Grand Traverse County
 Bass Lake, Itasca County, Minnesota, an unincorporated community near Wirt
 Bass Lake, Ohio, a census-designated place
 Bass Lake, Sawyer County, Wisconsin, a town
 Bass Lake, Washburn County, Wisconsin, a town

Lakes

Canada
Bass Lake (Ontario) – several lakes in Ontario with this name

United States
 Bass Lake (Madera County, California), a reservoir in the Sierra National Forest
 Bass Lake (Marin County, California), a small lake in Point Reyes National Seashore
 Bass Lake (Holly Springs, North Carolina)
 Bass Lake (Watauga County, North Carolina) a lake in the Moses H. Cone Memorial Park
 Bass Lake, Bass Lake, Indiana
 Bass Lake (Long Lake Township, Michigan), a small recreational lake west of Traverse City
 Bass Lake, Ely, Minnesota
 Bass Lake (Faribault County, Minnesota)
 Bass Lake (Mahnomen County, Minnesota)
 Camp Bass Lake, Owasippe Scout Reservation area near Whitehall, Michigan
 Bass Lake (Thurston County, Washington)